Pediatric surgery is a subspecialty of surgery involving the surgery of fetuses, infants, children, adolescents, and young adults.

History
Pediatric surgery arose in the middle of the 1879 century as the surgical care of birth defects required novel techniques and methods, and became more commonly based at children's hospitals. One of the sites of this innovation was Children's Hospital of Philadelphia. Beginning in the 1940s under the surgical leadership of C. Everett Koop, newer techniques for endotracheal anesthesia of infants allowed surgical repair of previously untreatable birth defects. By the late 1970s, the infant death rate from several major congenital malformation syndromes had been reduced to near zero.

Specialties
Subspecialties of pediatric surgery itself include: neonatal surgery and fetal surgery.

Other areas of surgery also have pediatric specialties of their own that require further training during the residencies and in a fellowship: pediatric cardiothoracic (surgery on the child's heart and/or lungs, including heart and/or lung transplantation), pediatric nephrological surgery (surgery on the child's kidneys and ureters, including renal, or kidney, transplantation), pediatric neurosurgery (surgery on the child's brain, central nervous system, spinal cord, and peripheral nerves), pediatric urological surgery (surgery on the child's urinary bladder and other structures below the kidney necessary for ejaculation), pediatric emergency surgery, surgery involving fetuses or embryos (overlapping with obstetric/gynecological surgery, neonatology, and maternal-fetal medicine), surgery involving adolescents or young adults, pediatric hepatological (liver) and gastrointestinal (stomach and intestines) surgery (including liver and intestinal transplantation in children), pediatric orthopedic surgery (muscle and bone surgery in children), pediatric plastic and reconstructive surgery (such as for burns, or for congenital defects like cleft palate not involving the major organs), and pediatric oncological (childhood cancer) surgery.

Conditions
Common pediatric diseases that may require pediatric surgery include: 
 Congenital malformations: lymphangioma, cleft lip and palate, esophageal atresia and tracheoesophageal fistula, hypertrophic pyloric stenosis, intestinal atresia, necrotizing enterocolitis, meconium plugs, Hirschsprung's disease, Anorectal Malformations, Undescended Testes (Cryptorchidism), intestinal malrotation, Biliary Atresia, Pelviureteric Junction Obstruction
 Abdominal wall defects: Omphalocele, Gastroschisis, Hernias
 Chest wall deformities:  Pectus Excavatum
 Childhood tumors: like Neuroblastoma, Wilms' tumor, Rhabdomyosarcoma, ATRT, Liver tumors, Teratomas, kidney tumors: 
 Separation of conjoined twins
 Disorders of Sexual Development

See Related Syndromes
VACTERL Association
Apert Syndrome
CHARGE Syndrome
Currarino Syndrome
Pierre Robin Sequence
Prune Belly Syndrome

See also
 William E. Ladd; known as the father of pediatric surgery.
  Lewis Spitz; Emeritus Nuffield Professor of Paediatric Surgery. Spitz was awarded Denis Browne Gold Medal, Rehbein Medal and the American Ladd Medal.
 Robert Edward Gross; president of the American Association for Thoracic Surgery, a member of the National Academy of Sciences and a fellow of the American Academy of Arts and Sciences. He was also awarded the Denis Browne Gold Medal and the American Ladd Medal for his contributions in Pediatric Surgery research.
 Morio Kasai; best known for the procedure that came to bear his name. He received the William E. Ladd Medal from the American Academy of Pediatrics, the Denis Browne Gold Medal from the British Association of Paediatric Surgeons and the Asahi Prize from the national newspaper known as the Asahi Shimbun.

Associations of Pediatric Surgery
 World Federation of Associations of Pediatric Surgeons: WOFAPS
 American Pediatric Surgical Association: APSA
 British Association of Paediatric Surgeons: BAPS
 Deutsche Gesellschaft für Kinderchirurgie: German Association of Paediatric Surgeons (DKH)
 Pan-African Paediatric Surgical Association: PAPSA

References